DC Universe (stylized DC UNIVERSE) is a DC Comics themed area at several Six Flags amusement parks. First opening at Six Flags Magic Mountain in 2011, the themed area has since expanded into multiple Six Flags amusement parks in North America. Although the layout and attractions are not identical and vary at each park, they all thematically connect with each other.

Shared attractions located within the themed area include Batman: The Ride, an inverted roller coaster at Six Flags Great America and Six Flags Magic Mountain and DC Super-Villains Swing, a swing ride at Six Flags Fiesta Texas and Six Flags Great America.

History 

A new attraction at Six Flags Magic Mountain was announced on October 20, 2010, when Green Lantern: First Flight was revealed to the public. The attraction would be placed within a new themed area replacing Gotham City Backlot, a themed area based on the fictional city Gotham City. The themed area would be a major change from the former Gotham City Backlot, and an editor for Theme Park Tourist noted that it switched themes from "dark and gritty" to a "typical comic-style punch of color."

The next DC Universe wouldn't come until more than half a decade later, in 2018, which would be at Six Flags México. When Wonder Woman Coaster opened, it caused the partial re-theme of the Villa Hollywood area, with the re-theme of two rides within the park, with SkyScreamer becoming Supergirl Sky Flight and Splash becoming Aquaman Splashdown, joining existing DC Comics themed rides Batman: The Ride and Justice League: Battle for Metropolis.

The third DC Universe themed area would come with the introduction of Batman: The Ride was introduced at Six Flags Discovery Kingdom. With the announcement for Batman: The Ride on August 30, 2018, the themed area was not announced until later the following year, in March 2019. Major changes to the area would include the re-theme of multiple rides and shops, including V2: Vertical Velocity, which, with the theme change, would become The Flash: Vertical Velocity. These changes would fit in with other rides already themed to DC Comics, such as The Joker, Harley Quinn Crazy Coaster and Superman: Ultimate Flight.

Another DC Universe themed area also opened in 2019, at Six Flags Fiesta Texas. This area would comprise both the Rockville and Spassburg areas within the park, and is still connected to the remaining parts of those two areas. The area was also introduced on August 30, 2018, and was officially announced along with The Joker Wild Card (later renamed The Joker Carnival of Chaos), a pendulum ride themed to super-villain the Joker. Other changes to the area would include the re-theme of Whirligig, which would be renamed Crime Wave, but plans never came through and the ride instead became DC Super-Villains Swing. DC Universe being separate from Rockville and Spassburg would be unclear though, as there is no delineation between the areas.

Six Flags New England would announce a Zamperla Endeavour attraction on August 29, 2019, with Supergirl Sky Flyer. The attraction, which is based on the super-hero Supergirl, would be a part of DC Universe, which replaced DC Comics Super Hero Adventures. The opening of both the attraction and the themed area was delayed until 2021, due to the effects of the COVID-19 pandemic.

At Six Flags Great America, after multiple teasers about the re-theme about the park's impulse roller coaster, Vertical Velocity, The Flash: Vertical Velocity and DC Universe was officially announced to the public on March 24, 2022, overhauling the Yankee Harbor section of the park, an original themed area which opened with the park in 1976. Besides the re-theme of Vertical Velocity, the newly themed area would feature re-themed versions of original rides, including DC Super-Villains Swing and Aquaman Splashdown. These attractions would join already-existing DC Comics themed rides, including Batman: The Ride and The Joker. DC Universe was planned to open on April 15, 2022, but due to supply chain issues and excesive rain, the area opened on April 23, 2022.

On April 28, 2022, in honor of National Superhero Day, Six Flags Magic Mountain announced their plans to renovate their DC Universe, due to the addition of Wonder Woman Flight of Courage, which was announced on October 21, 2021. The themed area would receive a new entrance portal sign and the re-theme of the flat ride Wonder Woman Lasso of Truth, in which it would become Teen Titans Turbo Spin.

Attractions

Flat rides and roller coasters

Restaurants

Shops

See also 

 
 Avengers Campus, themed lands at Disney California Adventure, Walt Disney Studios Park and Hong Kong Disneyland
 DC Comics Super Hero Adventures, defunct themed lands at the abandoned Six Flags New Orleans and Six Flags New England

References 

 Notes

 References

Themed areas in Six Flags amusement parks
Six Flags Magic Mountain
Six Flags México
Six Flags Discovery Kingdom
Six Flags Fiesta Texas
Six Flags New England
Six Flags Great America
DC Comics in amusement parks
2011 establishments in California
2019 establishments in California
2022 establishments in Illinois
2019 establishments in Texas
2021 establishments in Illinois
2018 establishments in Massachusetts